Zhou Heng (born 20 November 1929) is a Chinese physicist specializing in fluid dynamics.

Biography
Zhou was born in Shanghai, on 20 November 1929, while his ancestral home in Pucheng County, Fujian. His father was a primary school teacher. He has two elder sisters. After the Imperial Japanese Army occupied Shanghai in 1937, his family fled to different cities to take refuge.

In 1946, he was admitted to Peiyang University with the 1st ranking in his class, where he majored in the Hydraulic and Ocean Engineering. After graduating in 1950, he stayed at the university (later regrouped as Tianjin University), where he successively was lecturer, professor, head of Department of Mechanics, vice president and president of Graduate School. He was a visiting scholar at the Department of Mathematics, Imperial College London between 1981 and 1982. In 1985, he was hired as a visiting professor at Brown University.

He was a member of the 8th and 9th National Committee of the Chinese People's Political Consultative Conference.

Honours and awards
 1987 State Natural Science Award (Second Class)
 1993 Member of the Chinese Academy of Sciences (CAS)

References

1929 births
Living people
Scientists from Shanghai
Academic staff of Tianjin University
Members of the Chinese Academy of Sciences